You're Not Elected, Charlie Brown is the eighth prime-time animated TV special produced based upon the popular comic strip Peanuts by Charles M. Schulz, and the 10th one to air. It originally aired on CBS on October 29, 1972, nine days before the 1972 United States presidential election between incumbent Richard Nixon (R-CA).and Senator George McGovern (D-SD). It was the first new Peanuts special to air since the spring of 1971.

You're Not Elected, Charlie Brown ranked No. 9 in the Nielsen TV ratings the week it aired. It received a nomination for Outstanding Achievement in Children's Programming, which is Entertainment/Fictional at the 25th Primetime Emmy Awards in 1973.

Plot 
Sally Brown returns home from school and tells Charlie Brown that she cannot open her locker. Charlie Brown promises to help her open her locker every day, and Sally takes him in for show and tell.

At school, Charlie Brown sees an election poster for student body president. Linus Van Pelt thinks that Charlie Brown would make a great president, but Charlie is convinced that nobody would vote for him. Lucy appoints herself his campaign manager and takes a student poll, which only confirms Charlie's belief. When Lucy announces they will need to find another candidate, Sally Brown suggests Linus, and Lucy takes another poll, which is almost unanimously favorable toward Linus, so he enters the election.

Linus' campaign, assisted by Lucy and Charlie, is vigorous and enthusiastic, and he takes a huge early lead in the opinion poll against his opponent, Russell Anderson. At an assembly, Linus and Russell each make a campaign speech, with Linus receiving a rapturous response from the audience. However, at a subsequent assembly, he commits a major blunder when he goes off-script. Linus begins talking about the Great Pumpkin, causing Charlie and Lucy to scream in frustration. This gets Linus laughed off the stage, much to the anger of Lucy.

When election day finally arrives, it is a back and forth affair with the lead changing hands several times. The votes are tied when the final vote is submitted by Russell himself, who decides that Linus would be a better president, so the final ballot count declares Linus the winner, 84 to 83. Following his victory, Sally prods Linus to go to the principal and lay down the law, only to have the law laid down to him by the principal. After he sheepishly reveals this to Sally, she accuses Linus of selling out like all other politicians. She angrily kicks her locker and walks away, not realizing that she has finally opened the door.

Voice cast 
 Chad Webber as Charlie Brown 
 Stephen Shea as Linus van Pelt 
 Robin Kohn as Lucy van Pelt 
 Jean Vander Pyl as Lucy van Pelt (whispering) 
 Hilary Momberger as Sally Brown 
 Todd Barbee as Russell Anderson 
 Linda Ercoli as Violet 
 Brian Kazanjian as Schroeder 
 Bill Melendez as Snoopy and Woodstock

This special marked the debut television appearance of Woodstock, whose feature film debut was in Snoopy, Come Home, also released in 1972.

Patty, Frieda, Pig-Pen, 5, and Shermy also appear.

Production notes
The plot from You're Not Elected, Charlie Brown was taken from a story that ran in the comic strip in October 1964, in which Linus runs for school president with Charlie Brown as his running mate. In the original storyline, Linus blows the election (and Charlie Brown's bid for Vice President) after bringing up The Great Pumpkin in his final speech and being laughed off stage–again after leading in the polls at the time. Unlike the television special, Linus' opponent is never seen or mentioned. This special first aired under the title You're Elected Charlie Brown. It was subsequently changed after Charles Schulz realized that Charlie Brown was neither elected nor does he run. This explains why there is a caret between the words "You're" and "Elected" on the chalkboard (there was no time to redo the entire cel).

The same storyline, albeit adhering more closely to the original strip, was adapted for the Peanuts Motion Comics episode "Linus for President."

Music score
The music for You're Not Elected, Charlie Brown was composed by Vince Guaraldi and conducted and arranged by John Scott Trotter. The score was performed by the Vince Guaraldi Quintet on August 22, 1972, at Wally Heider Studios, featuring Tom Harrell (trumpet), Pat O'Hara (flute), Seward McCain (electric bass) and Glenn Cronkhite (drums).

You're Not Elected, Charlie Brown is notable for marking the debut of Snoopy's "Joe Cool" theme song, sung by Guaraldi.

"Incumbent Waltz (Theme from You're Not Elected, Charlie Brown)" (variation No. 1)
"You're Not Elected, Charlie Brown" (vocal version) 
"Incumbent Waltz (Theme from You're Not Elected, Charlie Brown)" (variation No. 2)
"Oh, Good Grief"
"Fast Piano Jazz" 
"Blue Charlie Brown" (up-tempo version) 
"Incumbent Waltz (Theme from You're Not Elected, Charlie Brown)" (variation No. 3)
"Trombone" [Teacher talks] 
"Linus and Lucy" 
"Poor Charlie Brown" 
"Joe Cool" (lead vocal: Vince Guaraldi)
"Incumbent Waltz (Theme from You're Not Elected, Charlie Brown)" (variation No. 4)
"Dilemma" 
"Woodstock's Wake-Up" 
"Joe Cool" (instrumental)
"Deserted Charlie Brown" (a variation of "Oh, Good Grief") 
"You're Not Elected, Charlie Brown" (slow piano version) 
"You're Not Elected, Charlie Brown" (Dixieland version) 
"Linus and Lucy" (chimes version)
"You're Not Elected, Charlie Brown" (Dixieland version) 

No official soundtrack for You're Not Elected, Charlie Brown was released, although select music cues have been made available on several compilation albums:
Both the vocal and extended instrumental versions of "Joe Cool" as well as "Incumbent Waltz (Theme from You're Not Elected, Charlie Brown)" (variation No. 4) appeared on Vince Guaraldi and the Lost Cues from the Charlie Brown Television Specials (2007)
"Oh, Good Grief" and the chimes-driven version of the Peanuts signature tune, "Linus and Lucy" appeared on Vince Guaraldi and the Lost Cues from the Charlie Brown Television Specials, Volume 2 (2008).

Home media
The special was first released on home video on RCA's SelectaVision CED format in 1982 along with It's the Great Pumpkin, Charlie Brown, It Was a Short Summer, Charlie Brown, and A Charlie Brown Thanksgiving. It was released on VHS and Betamax by Media Home Entertainment in 1985, along with A Charlie Brown Christmas. It was released on VHS again in 1988, this time under their kids subdivision Hi-Tops Video. On August 17, 1994, it accompanied It Was a Short Summer, Charlie Brown on a Snoopy Double Feature release from Paramount Home Entertainment. In 1995, it was released on LaserDisc as a bonus feature with A Charlie Brown Thanksgiving. It has been released on DVD twice, first as a "bonus feature" on the September 12, 2000 It's the Great Pumpkin, Charlie Brown DVD then on its own as part of Warner Home Video's "Remastered Deluxe Edition" line of Peanuts specials on October 7, 2008.

References

External links
 

Peanuts television specials
Television shows directed by Bill Melendez
1972 television specials
1970s American television specials
1970s animated television specials
1970s American animated films
1972 in American television
CBS television specials
CBS original programming
Works about elections
Television shows written by Charles M. Schulz